The  (Jawi: ڤاسوكن خاص تنترا اودارا) – it is better known as PASKAU – is the special operations force of the Royal Malaysian Air Force (RMAF). Its main functions are to carry out high-value target protection, ground forward air controller, combat search and rescue and rescuing downed aircrew assignments. PASKAU is also tasked as the principal anti-hijack response force for military and civil aircraft in Malaysia. This task was taken over from Grup Gerak Khas. All PASKAU members are airborne and commando-trained and can be deployed behind enemy lines via air, land and sea to assist in target designation for the Malaysian Armed Forces and RMAF missions. The PASKAU Headquarters is known as RMAF Regiment.

History

HANDAU 

PASKAU can trace its origins back to 1974. A mortar attack by Malayan Communist Party agents from outside of Kuala Lumpur RMAF Airbase, and in 1979, another mortar attack resulted in damage to an RMAF DHC-4 Caribou transport aircraft. Due to these incidents, a specific directive from the RMAF led to the formation of a new security force which would take over security of RMAF airbases from the Malaysian Army Royal Military Police Corps (RMPC). A cadre of RMAF airmen and officers was sent to PLPK (now known as PULPAK) to receive commando training. The force became known as Pasukan Pertahanan Darat dan Udara ('Air and Ground Defence Force'), or by its abbreviation, HANDAU, and was established on 1 April 1980. The new force was tasked as the security force for RMAF airbases. The first HANDAU squadron was named 102 HANDAU Squadron. A small number of Malaysian Army Grup Gerak Khas commandos were attached to HANDAU as RMAF Air Rescue Team.

RMAF Security Regiment Headquarters 
The 102 Squadron was the first unit to take over security duties from the RMPC at Kuala Lumpur RMAF Airbase, on 1 April 1980. RMAF Security Regiment Headquarters was established as HQ for HANDAU, and since the HQ establishment up to 1 March 1987, ten more HANDAU squadrons were established.

RMAF Regiment 
Since MAREJ's establishment in 1980, MAREJ reported directly to the Air Force Command for all operations involving the HANDAU squadrons. As part of the June 1983 reorganization of the RMAF, MAREJ was moved under the RMAF High Command and was also renamed as the RMAF Regiment. At the same time, the HANDAU squadrons were renamed to the RMAF Provost Squadrons. The RMAF Provost Squadrons was given with the task of providing security for RMAF Forward Operation Bases (FOB). As part of the same reorganization, two special operations (Spec Ops) elements also introduced to the RMAF Regiment. The special operations elements are Combat Air Rescue Team (CART) and Rapid Deployment Force (RDF).

PKU and PASKAU 

In 1996, the special operations elements were reorganised and given a new name – Pasukan Khas Udara (Abbr.: PKU; 'Air Special Forces'). The PKU strength was increased and its role expanded to include counter-terrorism, unconventional warfare and Search and Rescue missions. The unit also received training from the United Kingdom Special Air Service and the United States Special Operations Forces for their new roles.

On 17 March 1999, PKU was moved from Kuala Lumpur RMAF Air Base to Jugra RMAF Air Base. The RMAF Provost Squadrons was separated from RMAF Regiment and made into a single department – RMAF Provost Marshal Department. On 1 April 2002, 22 years after HANDAU establishment, PKU now officially known as Pasukan Khas TUDM (: PASKAU; 'RMAF Special Forces').

On 24 January 2008, the Sultan of Pahang, Sultan Ahmad Shah, was made an Honorary Colonel of the unit when he honoured the Honor Beret of PASKAU by Chief of Air Force, General Tan Sri Azizan Ariffin  (later promoted to Chief of Defence Force in 2009) at Jugra RMAF Regiment, Bukit Jugra, Banting, Selangor.

Combat elements

1980–1993 
RMAF Security Regiment Headquarters

 Air and Ground Defence Force (HANDAU)
 Air Rescue Team

1993–2002 
RMAF Regiment

 RMAF Provost Squadrons
 RMAF Special Operations
 Rapid Deployment Force
 Combat Air Rescue Team

Current combat formations 
Today, RMAF Regiment operates directly under RMAF Air Operations Headquarters and is located at Bukit Jugra RMAF Air Base, Banting. Below are the three main squadrons of PASKAU under the Operations Branch of the RMAF Regiment, the branch that responsible for special operations.

National Special Operations Force 
In 2016, the main counter-terrorism operators in Malaysia were formed into a single special operation task force. Several operators from FHRT of PASKAU were selected to be part of the National Special Operations Force.

Training and expertise

It is not obligatory for HANDAU airmen to pass the commando school, it is however compulsory for Special Operations airmen. Since 1996, it is becoming compulsory for any airmen wishing to join the PKU (the then name for the PASKAU) to complete the basic commando course. In 1993, the RMAF established their own commando course – the RMAF Commando Course. Prior to that, commando-trained RMAF Regiment airmen were required to pass the Malaysian Army Basic Commando Course offered at the PULPAK.

Currently, every officer and enlisted personnel are presented with a light blue beret and light blue lanyard once they pass the RMAF Commando Course, and a tactical knife after they pass the PASKAU expert course. They can then continue to complete further advanced training which allows them to take part in all operations.

On 6 May 2004, only 81 of 198 personnel who started the three month training program received their blue berets, including the best trainee Laskar Udara Meor Mohd Nazri Othman, 23, having survived the challenging three-month series 07/2004 Basic Commando Training while in October 2007, only 20 of the 54 trainees successfully completed the three-month training program.

RMAF Commando Course 
The course lasts for 12 weeks and has six modules. In this course, trainees will learn land, sea and air insertion, jungle warfare tactics, sabotage and hostage rescue.

 Camp Module
 Long-distance march
 Jungle Training Module
 Water Training Module
 Dark Water Module
 Survival, Escape, Resistance, Evasion (SERE) Module

PASKAU Expert Course 
PASKAU operatives are capable of conducting operations using:
Tactical
 Close quarters combat – CQC
 Combat diving
 Counter-insurgency
 Counter-terrorism
 Counter-sniper tactics
 Laser-designation – Using AN/PEQ-1 SOFLAM GLTD II, the units 'paint' hostile targets, marking them for attack by air-dropped laser-guided munitions such as the Paveway II LGB (laser-guided bomb)
 Marksmanship
 Sabotage
 Sang Moo Doo (multi-technique martial arts including Aikido, Judo, Karate and Taekwondo)
 Snipers
 Unconventional warfare

Insertion Techniques
 High-altitude military parachuting – high altitude low opening/high altitude high opening of parachutes
 Single occupant delivery operation module – insertion via fighter jet
 Hover jump
 Rappelling
 Special patrol insertion/extraction – SPIE rig

 Intelligence Gathering

 Special reconnaissance
 Counterintelligence
 Signal intelligence – SIGINT
 Long-range reconnaissance patrol
 Providing base security to RMAF installations

 Expertise Oriented

 Combat search and rescue (The recovery of friendly units from behind enemy lines)
 Operations in built up areas – OBUA
 Fighting in built-up areas – FIBUA
 Military operations on urbanized terrain – MOUT
 Hostage rescue
 Special demolitions
 Explosive ordnance disposal – EOD

During May 2009, PASKAU participated with the United States Air Force 320th Special Tactics Squadron in an underwater search and recovery course as part of a joint training exercise code-named Teak Mint 09-1. The USAF presented Barret M107 anti-material rifles for use by the RMAF PASKAU team. Teak Mint 09-1 is a joint training exchange designed to enhance United States – Malaysian military training and capabilities.

Role
PASKAU's establishment has increased the RMAF capability in special air operations such as Combat Search And Rescue (CSAR). It must also be capable of securing forward RMAF bases and be able to assist in the execution of airstrikes using specialist weapons. PASKAU consists of specially selected and trained RMAF regiment personnel. The role of this unit is very different from army Grup Gerak Khas; or the navy PASKAL.

Identities

Sky blue beret 

The Sky blue beret is worn by all HANDAU airmen and later by all units in the RMAF Regiment, including the RMAF special operations teams and RMAF Provost squadrons. Initially, commando-trained HANDAU unit members wore the green beret with GGK's cap badge similar to the GGK but with HANDAU cap badge backing. After RMAF Provost unit was separated from the RMAF Regiment, they were no longer permitted to wear the sky blue beret. Instead the RMAF Provost wear navy blue beret similar to other conventional RMAF units. All commando-trained RMAF Provost members are given a choice, either join the PASKAU and moved to RMAF Jugra Airbase or stay with the provost and their original bases. 

The sky blue beret is now only allowed to be worn by the PASKAU team members. 

The cap badge position is worn facing left between the end of the eyebrow and above the ear – similar to all other Malaysian commandos trained elite units.

Light blue lanyard 

Every member of commando-trained HANDAU was given with light blue lanyard together with green beret and Fairbairn–Sykes commando dagger once they completed their commando training at the PLPK (now PULPAK). The tradition of giving the light blue lanyard was inherited from the Malaysian Special Service Unit (MSSU; now known as 21 Grup Gerak Khas) which was originally from the 40 Commando, Royal Marines. The tradition was continued by HANDAU and later by PASKAU even after the RMAF established their own commando school in 1993.

Tactical knife 

PASKAU no longer issues Fairbairn–Sykes commando dagger to its members. Each graduate of the RMAF Commando School is issued with a tactical knife instead. The tactical knife is a symbol of jungle survivalist.

PASKAU shoulder tab 

PASKAU operators wear shoulder tab embroidered with "PASKAU" on the right shoulder sleeve. Shoulder tabs are synonymous with elite forces in Malaysian Armed Force.

Equipment

Functions

Target marking

To mark a target for an airstrike, such as radar or surface-to-air-missile (SAM) sites, sub-units must be able to infiltrate behind enemy lines. The target can then be 'painted' using GLTD II.

Security of important assets

The unit must secure critical RMAF areas from enemy ground attack. The task is made harder in forwarding locations and other hostile environments where the threat level is higher.

Search and rescue

Search and rescue missions, on land (on both sides of the lines) and at sea, are the responsibility of PASKAU. A wide variety of circumstances are usually encountered. For instance, when a Sikorsky S61 "Nuri" helicopter crashed on the slopes of Gunung Gerah in November 1989, reaching the wreckage required abseiling into the jungle. Other SAR missions are shown in the 'Recent Operations' section further down this page.

Counter-terrorism

Incidents involving hijacked aircraft and terrorists throughout Malaysia come under the remit of PASKAU. The unit is trained to solve the problem with the least effect on the passengers and aircraft.

Capabilities
Mobility

PASKAU is able to be rapidly inserted into an operational area by land, air or sea.

Flexibility

The group is capable of being deployed independently or as part of a joint task force with other special operations groups.

Sustainability

The unit is able to operate independently and conduct special operations for sustained periods without external assistance.

Technology

The group has access to high-tech equipment and weaponry to improve its ability to execute complex and demanding special operations.

Special training

The group employs specialised physical training that exceeds that of conventional forces. This is to ensure that operators are well-prepared to execute highly demanding Spec Ops-type missions. They are especially suited to classified missions involving small sub-units.

Mission and the future
The future direction for PASKAU includes the continuous expansion of the team expertise and roles as well as enhancing the team's effectiveness with newer and more capable equipment.

Recent operations

Operation Daulat
In March 2013, PASKAU commandos were deployed on a joint operation with all branches of the Malaysian Armed Forces, Royal Malaysia Police and Malaysian Maritime Enforcement Agency special forces to execute Operation Daulat. They conducted psychological operations against the Sulu terrorists by dropping leaflets to urge them to lay down their weapon and surrender to the authorities. The PASKAU commandos were used to paint enemies' target via GLTD for strikes by laser-guided bombs against terrorist camps at Kampung Tanduo, Lahad Datu.

MALCON-ISAF
Malaysia sent troops, including PASKAU, 10th Parachute Brigade, 21 Grup Gerak Khas and PASKAL to Afghianistan as part of thee International Security Assistance Force (ISAF) in Afghanistan. The team which consisted of 40 soldiers was deployed to assist New Zealand Armed Forces in the peacekeeping missions and humanitarian aid in the Bamiyan District, Afghanistan.

Genting Sempah incident
In July 2007, PASKAU, with the 10th Parachute Brigade, 22nd Commando Regiment of 21 Grup Gerak Khas and the Pasukan Gerakan Khas, supported by the United States Navy Air Fleet (from USS Jarrett (FFG-33)), Police General Operations Force Senoi Praaq, Police Air Wing, Fire and Rescue Department, Forestry Department Rangers, Civil Defence Department (JPA3) and local villagers, were deployed in a search and rescue operation after a RMAF Sikorsky S61 'Nuri' helicopter went down with a crew of six near Genting Sempah, in the Genting Highlands. The SAR team located the wreckage on 17 July at 1324hrs with its rotor blades detached. The bodies of all crew members were found in the cabin of the stricken aircraft.

MALCON-UNIFIL 2007
PASKAU was part of a contingent which also included the 10th Parachute Brigade, Grup Gerak Khas and PASKAL which were deployed to assist the administrative workload at the UN Interim Force in Lebanon (UNIFIL) headquarters in Lebanon which 160 soldiers including 3 Malaysian special forces as the Quick Reaction Team.

Hawk 208 crash
On 27 June 2006, PASKAU was involved in the search for Major Muhammad Rohaizan Abdul Rahman  after his Hawk 208 fighter crashed into the sea off Rompin, Pahang on 31 May 2006. The remains of the pilot were found on the seabed 28 days after the crash, 150 meters off the coast of Pantai Lanjut, Rompin, Pahang.

Bukit Batu Tiban incident
PASKAU was involved in rescue operations on 28 July 2005, after a Hornbill Skyway Bell 206 Jet Ranger helicopter crashed in Bukit Batu Tiban, Ulu Baleh, Kapit, near the Sarawak-West Kalimantan border. Three passengers and the pilot died, one passenger survived.

Brinchang incident
On 7 June 2005, 21 PASKAU and 35 VAT 69 of the Pasukan Gerakan Khas operators were involved in the search for four children who were reported to be missing on Fraser's Hill as well as another two persons who were lost on Gunung Brinchang in the Cameron Highlands. They were all found three days later.

Piper 28 crash
PASKAU, together with the Department of Civil Aviation (DCA) and the 10th Parachute Brigade of the Malaysian Army, were involved on 14 March 2004, in the search and rescue of the occupants of a civilian Piper 28 aircraft which had crashed. The aircraft went down in a heavily forested area 3.2 kilometres south-west of the Langat Dam, Selangor. The pilot, Captain Nasir Ma Lee Abdullah, was killed while the passenger, Nazarullah Mohd Sultan, was found alive.

PASKAU boat capsizing
On 19 January 2003, a fibreglass boat carrying two senior officers and four servicemen from PASKAU capsized after encountering large waves in stormy conditions. This occurred during reconnaissance operations in the vicinity of Sibu Island, Johor at around 10:30 am. RMAF Majors Audrey Smith and Damian Sebastian, Sergeants Radzi Abdul Majid and Saad Che Omar were safely recovered while Corporals Hasnul Abdul Rahman and Ayub Sidek perished.

Bukit Galla incident
PASKAU with RMP General Operations Force, the State Forestry Department, the Civil Defence Department (JPA 3), the Department of Civil Aviation and the Negeri Sembilan Fire and Rescue Department, were involved on 20 February 1999, in search and rescue operations after a civilian Beechcraft BE-36 aircraft crashed into the slopes of Bukit Galla, Mantin, Negeri Sembilan. The pilot and his passenger, Patrick Dutrey and Natalie Marie Chappate, were killed.

Gunung Gerah incident
On 14 November 1989, PASKAU was involved in rescue operations after a TUDM Sikorsky S61 'Nuri' helicopter went down on the slopes of Gunung Gerah and Gunung Bilah near the Kelantan-Perak border. 21 passengers were killed, including 15 policemen from the General Operations Force of the Royal Malaysia Police.

See also
Elite Forces of Malaysia
Malaysian Army 21st Grup Gerak Khas
Malaysian Army 10th Parachute Brigade
 Royal Malaysian Navy PASKAL
 Malaysia Coast Guard Special Task and Rescue
 Royal Malaysia Police Pasukan Gerakan Khas

References

External links 

 Pasukan Khas Udara Royal Malaysian Air Force

Airborne units and formations
Military counterterrorist organizations
Military units and formations established in 1980
Special forces of Malaysia
Counterterrorism in Malaysia
Air force special forces units